Hoplopholcus minous is a cellar spider species found in Crete.

See also 
 List of Pholcidae species

References 

Pholcidae
Spiders of Europe
Spiders described in 1971